Tõnu Endrekson (born 11 June 1979) is an Estonian rower. He is a five time Olympic finalist and dual Olympic medal winner. He was fourth in the double sculls event with Leonid Gulov at the 2004 Summer Olympics in Athens and won a silver medal in 2008 Summer Olympics in Beijing in the double sculls event with Jüri Jaanson. He is a member of rowing club "Pärnu Sõudeklubi" (Pärnu Rowing Club) located in Pärnu.

Junior years
Endrekson competed in the World Rowing Junior Championships in 1996 in the double sculls event (24th) and 1997 in the single sculls event (16th). In 2001 he won a gold medal in the World Rowing U23 Regatta (now World Rowing U23 Championships) in the double sculls event with Leonid Gulov.

Olympic Games
His first appearance in the Olympic Games was in Athens 2004, where he competed in the double sculls event with Leonid Gulov. The men were third in their preliminary heat and second in semi-final thus earning a place in the Final A. They held the sixth position for the first 1500 metres, but with the strong final 500 metres they managed to clinch the fourth position. Eventually they lost the bronze medal to Italians Rossano Galtarossa and Alessio Sartori by 2,37 seconds.

In Beijing 2008 Endrekson also competed in the double sculls event but now with Estonian rowing legend Jüri Jaanson. The duo was third in their preliminary heat. In the semi-finals the men were second and assured themselves a place in the Final A. They finished second in the final just 0,05 seconds in front of the British duo Matthew Wells and Stephen Rowbotham.

At London 2012, he competed in the men's quadruple sculls with Andrei Jämsä, Allar Raja and Kaspar Taimsoo, finishing in fourth place.

World Championships
Endrekson debuted in the World Rowing Championships in 2001 in Lucerne, Switzerland. He competed in the quadruple sculls event with Leonid Gulov, Andrei Šilin and Silver Sonntak. They won the Final B and earned 7th place.

2002 in Seville, Spain, he was a member of the quadruple sculls team with Andrei Šilin, Igor Kuzmin and Silver Sonntak. They won the Final B and earned 7th place.

2003 in Milan, Italy Endrekson, Gulov, Šilin and Sonntak were 7th once more.

Endrekson won his first World Championships medal in 2005 in Gifu, Japan in the quadruple sculls event with Andrei Jämsä, Leonid Gulov and Jüri Jaanson when they finished third after Poland and Slovenia.

In the 2006 World Championships held in Eton, Great Britain Endrekson was again in the bronze-winning quadruple sculls team with Jämsä, Kuzmin and Allar Raja. Gold medals went to Poland and silver medals to Ukraine.

In 2007 season Endrekson decided to compete in the double sculls with Jaanson. They won two World Cup events and were third in the World Championships in Munich, Germany, after Slovenia and France.

For the 2009 World Championships held in Poznań, Poland, Endrekson was back in the quadruple sculls team, this time together with Jämsä, Kuzmin and Vladimir Latin. The team finished 10th overall.

Endrekson competed in the 2010 World Championships in the single sculls event finishing 9th overall.

In the 2015 FISA World Rowing Championships (Lac d'Aiguebelette) he won a bronze medal in the quadruple scull with Allar Raja, Kaspar Taimsoo and Andrei Jämsä

Achievements
Olympic Games Medals: 1 Silver, 1 Bronze
World Championship Medals: 4 Bronze
European Championship Medals: 3 Gold, 1 Silver
World U23 Championship Medals: 1 Gold

Olympic Games
2004 – 4th, Double sculls (with Leonid Gulov)
2008 – Silver , Double sculls (with Jüri Jaanson)
2012 – 4th, Quadruple sculls (with Andrei Jämsä, Allar Raja, Kaspar Taimsoo)
2016 – Bronze , Quadruple sculls (with Andrei Jämsä, Allar Raja, Kaspar Taimsoo)

World Rowing Championships
2001 – 7th, Quadruple sculls (with Silver Sonntak, Andrei Šilin, Leonid Gulov)
2002 – 7th, Quadruple sculls (with Silver Sonntak, Igor Kuzmin, Andrei Šilin)
2003 – 7th, Quadruple sculls (with Silver Sonntak, Andrei Šilin, Leonid Gulov)
2005 – Bronze , Quadruple sculls (with Jüri Jaanson, Leonid Gulov, Andrei Jämsä)
2006 – Bronze , Quadruple sculls (with Allar Raja, Igor Kuzmin, Andrei Jämsä)
2007 – Bronze , Double sculls (with Jüri Jaanson)
2009 – 10th, Quadruple sculls (with Igor Kuzmin, Vladimir Latin, Andrei Jämsä)
2010 – 9th, Single sculls
2011 – 16th, Quadruple sculls (with Kaur Kuslap, Sten-Erik Anderson, Andrei Jämsä)
2014 – 16th, Double sculls (with Andrei Jämsä)
2015 – Bronze , Quadruple sculls (with Andrei Jämsä, Allar Raja, Kaspar Taimsoo)
2017 – Bronze , Quadruple sculls (with Kaspar Taimsoo, Allar Raja, Kaur Kuslap)

European Rowing Championships
2008 – Gold , Quadruple sculls (with Allar Raja, Andrei Jämsä, Jüri Jaanson)
2009 – 8th, Quadruple sculls (with Igor Kuzmin, Valeri Prosvirnin, Andrei Jämsä)
2010 – 5th, Single sculls
2011 – Silver , Quadruple sculls (with Andrei Jämsä, Allar Raja, Kaspar Taimsoo)
2012 – Gold , Quadruple sculls (with Andrei Jämsä, Allar Raja, Kaspar Taimsoo)
2013 – 12th, Single sculls
2014 – 14th, Double sculls (with Andrei Jämsä)
2015 – 8th, Quadruple sculls (with Allar Raja, Sten-Erik Anderson, Kaspar Taimsoo)
2016 – Gold , Quadruple sculls (with Andrei Jämsä, Allar Raja, Kaspar Taimsoo)

U23 World Rowing Championships
2001 – Gold , Double sculls (with Leonid Gulov)

Junior World Rowing Championships
1996 – 24th, Double sculls
1997 – 16th, Single sculls

Rowing World Cup
Overall wins
 Quadruple sculls: 2005
 Double sculls: 2007

Orders
 Order of the White Star, 2nd Class: 2009

References

External links

 
 
 
 
 

1979 births
Living people
Estonian male rowers
Olympic rowers of Estonia
Olympic bronze medalists for Estonia
Olympic silver medalists for Estonia
Olympic medalists in rowing
Rowers at the 2004 Summer Olympics
Rowers at the 2008 Summer Olympics
Rowers at the 2012 Summer Olympics
Rowers at the 2016 Summer Olympics
Rowers at the 2020 Summer Olympics
Medalists at the 2008 Summer Olympics
Medalists at the 2016 Summer Olympics
World Rowing Championships medalists for Estonia
Recipients of the Order of the White Star, 2nd Class
University of Tartu alumni
Sportspeople from Pärnu